Raymond-Jacques Tournay (1912-1999) was a French Dominican, member of the École Biblique, Biblical scholar and assyriologist.

Honours 
Tournay is recipient of two French titles: ordre national du Mérite (1972) then Légion d'honneur (1981).

On 15 November 1994 the University of Fribourg awarded him an honorary degree for half a century of both scientific activity, efforts to promote peace between Jews and Arabs, and concern for the poor and political prisoners .

Bibliography 
 Le Psautier de Jérusalem, Éditions du Cerf, 1986  
 L'Épopée de Gilgamesh  Introduction, traduction et notes, ouvrage publié avec le concours du CNRS, with Aaron Shaffer, Éditions du Cerf,  1977  (series Littératures anciennes du Proche-Orient)
 Quand Dieu parle aux hommes le langage de l'amour. Études sur le Cantique des Cantiques, Gabalda, 1995 
 Voir et entendre Dieu avec les Psaumes. Ou la liturgie prophétique du second Temple à Jérusalem, Gabalda, 1982 
 Preface
 Prince Hassan bin Talal, Islam et Christianisme, Brepols, 1997

External links 
 École biblique et archéologique de Jérusalem 

1912 births
Writers from Paris
1999 deaths
French Dominicans
French biblical scholars
Translators of the Bible into French
French Assyriologists
Recipients of the Legion of Honour
20th-century translators
Academic staff of École Biblique
Assyriologists